Last Moon is a 2005 Chilean-Mexican drama film directed by Miguel Littín. It was entered into the 27th Moscow International Film Festival.

Cast
 Aymann Abuloff as Solymann
 Tamara Acosta as Matty
 Alejandro Goic as Jacobeo
 Francisca Merino as Alinne

References

External links
 

2005 films
2005 drama films
2000s Turkish-language films
Films directed by Miguel Littín
Chilean drama films
Mexican drama films
2000s Mexican films